Athletics was one of ten core sports that appeared at the 2014 Commonwealth Games in Glasgow. As a founding sport, athletics has appeared consistently since its introduction at the 1911 Inter-Empire Games; the recognised precursor to the Commonwealth Games.

The competition took place between Sunday 27 July and Saturday 2 August at the temporarily modified Hampden Park, Scotland's national football stadium. The programme commenced with the 26.2 mile marathon, which started and finished at Glasgow Green and included numerous para-sport events throughout. Racewalking events were dropped from the programme for 2014 – a move condemned by walking athletes.

The meet was dominated, in terms of golds won, by Kenya, Jamaica who won 10 gold medals  apiece and Australia with eight gold medals, though gold and other medals were distributed among 21 teams, and England took away the most medals, 27 including 13 silver medals.

Kenya dominated the distance events, and Jamaica the sprint events, but both also won throwing events for the first time. Host nation Scotland won 4 medals, including gold for Libby Clegg in the T(12) 100 m for athletes with a vision impairment.

Nigeria's Blessing Okagbare took two golds and a silver medal in the three sprint events, the most successful individual athlete at the meet. Jamaican sprint Olympic and World champions Usain Bolt and Shelly-Ann Fraser-Pryce both decided to forgo the individual sprint events, but appeared on the final evening of the meet to win golds in the relays.

Preparation
In preparation for hosting the Commonwealth Games Athletics events, the modified Hampden Park held the full-test Sainsbury's Grand Prix Diamond League event, usually held in London, on Saturday 12 July and Sunday 13 July 2014.

Medal summary

Men

† = Athletes who ran in the heats of the relay, but not in the final

Men's para-sport

Women

† = Athletes who ran in the heats of the relay, but not in the final

Women's para-sport

Medal table

Schedule
Over the 10 days of competition there were 44 medal events plus an additional 6 para-sport disciplines.

Doping
Doping controls were undertaken on competing athletes during the games. Amantle Montsho, a Botswana 400 metres runner and defending Commonwealth Games champion, was the first competitor from the athletics programme to fail a drugs test. After finishing fourth in the 400 m final, her "A" sample came back positive for methylhexanamine, a banned stimulant, and she was provisionally suspended pending investigation.

References

External links

Commonwealth Games Athletics 
Official results book – Athletics

 
2014
2014 Commonwealth Games events
Commonwealth Games
2014 Commonwealth Games